The 1988–89 season is FC Barcelona's 90th season in existence and the club's 58th consecutive season in the top flight of Spanish football.

Squad

Transfers

Competitions

La Liga

League table

Results by Round

Matches

Copa del Rey

Round of 32

Round of 16

Quarter-finals

European Cup Winners Cup

First round

Second round

Quarter-finals

Semi-finals

Final

Supercopa

Statistics

Players statistics

External links
www.fcbarcelona.cat Official Site

FC Barcelona seasons
Barcelona
UEFA Cup Winners' Cup-winning seasons